Oreopanax peltatus is a species of plant in the family Araliaceae. It is found in Guatemala and Mexico. It is threatened by habitat loss.

References

peltatus
Vulnerable plants
Taxonomy articles created by Polbot
Trees of Guatemala
Trees of Mexico
Cloud forest flora of Mexico